The Iceland Davis Cup team represents Iceland in Davis Cup tennis competition and are governed by the Icelandic Tennis Association.

Iceland currently compete in the fourth group of Europe Zone.

History
Iceland competed in its first Davis Cup in 1996.

Current team (2022) 

 Egill Sigurdsson
 Rafn Bonifacius (Captain-player)
 Daniel Siddall
 Sigurbjartur Atlason

See also

Davis Cup
Iceland Fed Cup team

External links

Davis Cup teams
Davis Cup
Davis Cup